Imara Daima is a neighbourhood in the city of Nairobi.

Overview
Imara Daima is zoned as a mixed residential development neighbourhood. Home to the middle-class segment of Nairobi residents, the estate is predominantly characterised by gated neighbourhoods with maisonettes and bungalows, roofed with maroon tiles. It is a sharp contrast of the neighbouring Mukuru and Pipeline slums. Other housing developments also found in Imara Daima are flats. The larger Imara Daima neighbourhood, especially along the Mombasa Road and Tegla Lorupe Road, is mixed-use with the commercial and industrial sector.

Imara Daima ward, an electoral division within Embakasi South Constituency borrows its name from the estate. The ward covers the estate to the south of Nairobi City County.

As of 2019, Imara Daima had a population of 52,837, with 26,954 of them being male and 25,879 being female. The neighbourhood had a population density of 25,920/km2 in a land area of 2km2.

References

 

Suburbs of Nairobi